Challen is a surname. Notable people with the surname include:

Albert Charles Challen (1847–1881), British artist
Charles Challen (1894–1960), British barrister and politician
Charles Challen (cricketer) (1790-?), English first-class cricketer 
Colin Challen (born 1953), British politician
Craig Challen, Australian technical diver and cave explorer
James Challen senior, English cricketer
James Challen junior (1825–1900), English cricketer
John Challen (1863–1937), Welsh amateur sportsman who played first-class cricket and association football
Michael Challen (born 1932), Australian Anglican bishop
William Challen (1786-?), English first-class cricketer

See also
Challen (given name)